Inder Singh may refer to:

 Inder Singh (field hockey) (1946–2001), Indian field hockey player
 Inder Singh (footballer) (born 1943), Indian footballer
 Inder Singh (philanthropist) (born 1977), administrator of the U.S. Clinton Foundation
 Inder Singh (community leader) (born 1932), Indian community leader in California

See also
 Singh